Edward Cooper (February 26, 1873 – March 1, 1928) was a lawyer and Republican politician who represented West Virginia in the United States House of Representatives during the 64th and 65th United States Congresses from 1915 to 1919.

Cooper was born in Trevorton, Pennsylvania. He moved with his parents to Fayette County, West Virginia in 1875 where he attended public and private schools. He graduated from Washington and Lee University, Lexington, Virginia in 1892, and subsequently from the law department of the same university. He was admitted to the bar in 1894 and practiced law for three years in Bramwell, West Virginia where he was also a member of the town council for eight years.

On the death of his father, Cooper abandoned the practice of law and engaged in the development of coal properties in West Virginia. He was a delegate to the Republican National Convention in 1912 and elected as a Republican to the Sixty-fourth and Sixty-fifth Congresses (March 4, 1915 – March 3, 1919). He was unsuccessful candidate for reelection in 1918 to the Sixty-sixth Congress. After leaving Congress, he again engaged in the production of coal in Mercer and McDowell Counties, West Virginia and served as a director in several coal companies. He died in Bluefield, West Virginia in 1928 and was buried in Hollywood Cemetery, Richmond, Virginia.

See also
 United States congressional delegations from West Virginia
 List of United States representatives from West Virginia

Sources

1873 births
1928 deaths
American lawyers
Washington and Lee University alumni
Washington and Lee University School of Law alumni
People from Fayette County, West Virginia
Burials at Hollywood Cemetery (Richmond, Virginia)
Republican Party members of the United States House of Representatives from West Virginia
People from Bramwell, West Virginia